The Scottish Rally Championship is a rallying series run throughout Scotland over the course of a year, that comprises both gravel and closed surface rallies.

Points are awarded to the top placed drivers and the driver scoring the highest number of points over the season is declared Champion. The championship has always been a breeding ground for many World Rally Championship drivers, including Colin & Alister McRae, Robbie Head and Barry Clark.

Notable previous champions have included Mitsubishi Ralliart founder Andrew Cowan, who won the championship in 1976 in a Colt Lancer, and former World Rally Champion, Colin McRae who performed a giant killing act when he took the series crown in 1988 in his humble Vauxhall Nova.

Colin McRae Forest Stages Rally 2008
The 2008 season finale, the Colin McRae Forest Stages Rally saw an enhanced entry list of 'rally legends' in honour of Colin who died in 2007. The impressive entry list included ex-World Championship drivers Hannu Mikkola, Ari Vatanen (partnered by his 1981 WRC winning co-driver David Richards), Björn Waldegård, Malcolm Wilson, Russell Brookes, Jimmy McRae, Andrew Cowan and Louise Aitken-Walker, many competing in their original cars. A handful of current WRC drivers also took part including Matthew Wilson and Travis Pastrana. The event was deemed a great success, attracting record spectator numbers to the Perthshire forests. Outright winner was Stobart VK M-Sport Ford Rally Team driver Matthew Wilson in a Ford Focus WRC, with Colin's brother Alister winning the "legends" portion of the rally.

Champions

See also
World Rally Championship
British Rally Championship

References

External links
 Scottish Rally Championship Homepage
 RSAC Scottish Rally Homepage
 'Jaggy Bunnet' extensive SRC info site
 Flying Finish, SRC live results page

 
Rally racing series
Motorsport in Scotland
Auto racing series in the United Kingdom
Sports competitions in Scotland